Wheelerigobius wirtzi, the Cameroon goby, is a species of goby native to the Atlantic coast of Africa where it is so far known from Victoria Bay, Cameroon and São Tomé Island. The species can reach a length of  SL. The specific name honours the ichthyologist and blenny taxonomist Peter Wirtz who collected the type specimen.

References

Gobiinae
Taxa named by Peter J. Miller
Fish described in 1988

hu:Wheelerigobius